Behr syndrome  is characterized by the association of early-onset optic atrophy with spinocerebellar degeneration resulting in ataxia, pyramidal signs, peripheral neuropathy and developmental delay.

Although it is an autosomal recessive disorder, heterozygotes may still manifest much attenuated symptoms. Autosomal dominant inheritance also being reported in a family. Recently a variant of OPA1 mutation with phenotypic presentation like Behr syndrome is also described. Some reported cases have been found to carry mutations in the OPA1, OPA3 or C12ORF65 genes which are known causes of pure optic atrophy or optic atrophy complicated by movement disorder.

Signs and symptoms 
Onset : Early childhood

Progression: Chronic progressive

Clinical: Cerebellar ataxia plus syndrome / Optic Atrophy Plus Syndrome

Ocular: Optic atrophy, nystagmus, scotoma, and bilateral retrobulbar neuritis.

Other: Mental retardation, myoclonic epilepsy, spasticity, and posterior column sensory loss. Tremor in some cases.

Musculoskeletal

Contractures, lower limbs, Achilles tendon contractures, Hamstring contractures, Adductor longus contractures

Systemic

Hypogonadotrophic hypogonadism.

Genetics

Behr syndrome is autosomal recessive which means the defective gene is located on an autosome, and two copies of the gene - one inherited from each parent - are required to be born with the disorder. The parents of an individual with an autosomal recessive disorder both carry one copy of the defective gene, but are usually not affected by the disorder. Autosomal dominant inheritance also being reported.

Compound heterozygous mutations in  OPA1 gene were reported. Molecular genetic studies revealed a homozygous mutation in the C19ORF12 gene which has been previously reported in patients with mitochondrial membrane protein-associated neurodegeneration (MPAN) a variant of neurodegeneration with brain iron accumulation (NBIA).

Pathology 
Autopsy on one of the sister with Behr Syndrome revealed central atrophy of the optic nerves and total disarray of the normal laminar pattern of the lateral geniculate nucleus, dropout of neurons, and gliosis. There were numerous axonal spheroids in the neuropil. Similar spheroids with cell loss and gliosis were also observed in other thalamic nuclei and, rarely, in the pallida.

Diagnosis 
Diagnosis is suspected clinically and family history, neuroimaging and genetic study helps to confirm Behr Syndrome.

Neuroimaging 

Diffuse, symmetric white matter abnormalities were demonstrated by magnetic resonance imaging (MRI) suggesting that Behr syndrome may represent a disorder of white matter associated with an unknown biochemical abnormality.

Treatment 
Management for this condition is supportive

See also
 List of systemic diseases with ocular manifestations
 Leber's Hereditary Optic Atrophy
 Mitochondrial Disorders
 Optic Atrophy

References

External links 
 
 Behr Syndrome at Omim.com

Autosomal recessive disorders
Neurological disorders
Rare syndromes
Syndromes affecting the nervous system
Genetic disorders with OMIM but no gene
Syndromes affecting the eye